Konow's Cabinet was a Norwegian cabinet, formed by a coalition of the Conservative Party and the Free-minded Liberal Party. It was in office from 2 February 1910 to 20 February 1912.

Cabinet members

|}

State Secretary
Not to be confused with the modern title State Secretary. The old title State Secretary, used between 1814 and 1925, is now known as Secretary to the Government (Regjeringsråd).

Nils Otto Hesselberg

References

Notes

Konow
Konow
Konow
1910 establishments in Norway
1912 disestablishments in Norway
Cabinets established in 1910
Cabinets disestablished in 1912